St Gwenog's Church is a Church in Wales church near Llanybydder, Ceredigion, Wales. It is a medieval building dating back to the late fourteenth century and is situated in the hamlet of Llanwenog on a minor road off the A475 near Drefach, Ceredigion. It is a Grade I-listed building.

This is a medieval church, and the only one dedicated to Saint Gwenog. It dates to the late fourteenth and fifteenth centuries, with the fine tower being added some time after 1485. It bears a plaque with the arms of Rhys ap Thomas, Lord of Dinefwr and Carew. The interior has the original fifteenth-century barrel roof. The pews and other church furnishings are elaborately carved. Some of the work was done by and to the design of Colonel Herbert Davies-Evans of Highmead at the beginning of the nineteenth century, and others by the celebrated Belgian wood-carver, Joseph Reubens of Bruges during the period 1914 to 1919.

The church was granted Grade I-listed status on 6 March 1964, for being "the most complete medieval church in Cardiganshire, with fine late C15 roof and tower".

References

Llanwenog, St Gwenog
Llanwenog, St Gwenog